Kamorta or Kalatapu is a village on the Kamorta Island, in the Nicobar district of Andaman and Nicobar Islands. It is located in the Nancowry tehsil. This is also the home of Indian Naval Base named INS Kardip, which was commissioned in 1973.

Demographics 

According to the 2011 census of India, Kamorta/Kalatapu (including Sanuh) has 513 households. The effective literacy rate (i.e. the literacy rate of population excluding children aged 6 and below) is 88.44%.

References 

Villages in Nancowry tehsil
Islands of the Andaman and Nicobar Islands